"The Streets" is a song by American rapper WC, released as the first single from his second studio album Ghetto Heisman (2002). The song features guest appearances from fellow rappers Snoop Dogg and Nate Dogg, and is produced by record producer Scott Storch, who helped write the song alongside the three rappers.

An official remix featuring rapper Xzibit was also released.

Music video 
The music video, directed by Chris Robinson, was shot in the Los Angeles Memorial Coliseum and features a competition called the "Ghetto Olympics". It opens with WC running from the police while holding a torch, which he uses to light a flame signaling the beginning of the contest. While WC, Snoop Dogg and Nate Dogg rap, Ghetto Olympians participate in a race involving jumping over backyard fences, as well as competitions of Crip walking, hair braiding, "pimp beauty", tattooing and Kool-Aid making. WC rolls a pair of dice in the finals.

Track listing 
US 12" single
 "The Streets" (Radio Edit) – 4:07
 "The Streets" (Explicit Version) – 4:06
 "Walk" – 4:00

Charts

References 

2002 singles
2002 songs
Snoop Dogg songs
Nate Dogg songs
Def Jam Recordings singles
Song recordings produced by Scott Storch
Songs written by Scott Storch
Songs written by Snoop Dogg
Songs written by WC (rapper)